The Pan Pacific Hotels and Resorts (泛太平洋酒店及度假村) is a hospitality company headquartered in Singapore and founded in 1975. It is a subsidiary of developer UOL Group and operates more than 20 luxury hotels, resorts and serviced suites across Asia, North America, Oceania, and Europe.

History
The brand name "Pan Pacific Hotels" was born when Japanese conglomerate Tokyu Group established its new marketing identity and sales network for its hotels in 1975, under Tokyu Hotels International. The first Pan Pacific hotel established was Sari Pan Pacific in Jakarta, which was opened in 1976.

It established the Emerald Management Company (EMC) to manage its hotels in Hawaii and California in 1983, and in the same year, the Traveller's Palm logo was born. In 1986, Pan Pacific Vancouver and Pan Pacific Singapore were opened. Tokyu Hotels International and EMC merged to become Pan Pacific Hotels and Resorts, and in 1989, the Traveller's Palm logo became the company-wide mark for the hotel group.

In 2007, UOL Group Limited acquired Pan Pacific Hotels and Resorts from Tokyu, and renamed it to Pan Pacific Hotels Group. In 2007, Pan Pacific Hotels and Resorts became a founding member of the Global Hotel Alliance, the world's largest alliance of independent hotel brands comprising more than 30 member brands with over 550 upscale and luxury hotels with 110,000 rooms across 76 countries.

Activities

Hotels 

Pan Pacific Hotels and Resorts has since extended its presence to other parts of Asia and North America, including Beijing, Dhaka, Kuala Lumpur, Kota Kinabalu, Manila, Melbourne, Singapore, Vancouver, Whistler, Hanoi and Seattle. Its Anaheim location, built in 1984, was acquired by The Walt Disney Company in 1995, and subsequently integrated into the Disneyland Resort as Disney's Paradise Pier Hotel.

The group also owns the Parkroyal Hotels & Resorts brand, which includes the Parkroyal Collection Pickering.

Serviced suites 
The hotel group also operates serviced suites in both Pan Pacific and Parkroyal brands. In 2008, the brand launched its first extended-stay property with Pan Pacific Serviced Suites Orchard, Singapore. In 2010, it opened Pan Pacific Serviced Suites Bangkok and in 2013, Pan Pacific Serviced Suites Beach Road, Singapore, welcomed its first guests. Pan Pacific Service Suites Jakarta will be opened by 2020 at Indonesia-1 Tower and Parkroyal Suites Jakarta will be housed at Thamrin Nine in Jakarta.

See also

References

External links

 

Hospitality companies of Singapore
Hospitality companies
Hotel chains in Singapore
Singaporean brands